Aavriti Choudhary (born April 4, 1998) is an Indian model and beauty pageant titleholder who was crowned Miss Diva Supranational 2020. She represented India at Miss Supranational 2021 on 20 August 2021 at Malopolska in Poland and made it to the Top 12 finalists.

Early life and education
Choudhary attended secondary school at St. Joseph's Convent Girls' Senior Secondary School. She later began attending Prestige Institute of Management And Research in Indore, where she graduated with a degree in business administration.

Pageantry

Miss Diva - 2020
In 2019, Choudhary auditioned for the Miss Diva - 2020 contest, through the Indore auditions and was shortlisted as a city finalist. In the final round of selections in Mumbai, she was finalized as one of the Top 20 delegates. On 22 February 2020, she was eventually crowned as Miss Diva Supranational 2020 by the outgoing titleholder Shefali Sood and sashed by Miss Supranational 2019, Anntonia Porsild at Yash Raj Studio, Andheri, Mumbai.

Miss Supranational 2021
As Miss Diva Supranational 2020, Choudhary represented India at the Miss Supranational 2021 competition held at Malopolska in Poland and made it to the Top 12 finalists. She finished at the Tenth spot.

Media 
Choudhary was ranked in The Times Most Desirable Women at No. 10 in 2020.

References

External links

1998 births
Female models from Madhya Pradesh
Living people
Indian beauty pageant winners
Indian female models
People from Madhya Pradesh
People from Indore
Miss Supranational contestants